Robert Hopton (died 1638) was an English politician.

Robert Hopton may also refer to:

Robert Hopton (died 1590), MP for Mitchell
Robert Hopton (MP for Wallingford), see Wallingford (UK Parliament constituency)